Bab Sidi Abdallah Cherif is one of the gates of the medina of Tunis, the capital of Tunisia. It was situated at the south-western extremity of the kasbah, but has been destroyed. 

It is also called Bab El Ghedar which means "Gate of the treason".

Etymology
This gate takes its name from a saint, Sidi Abdallah Cherif, whose tomb is nearby, outside the medina of Tunis's rampart.

References

Sidi Abdallah Cherif